Wedding Present is a 1936 romantic screwball comedy film directed by Richard Wallace and starring Joan Bennett and Cary Grant. The screenplay was written by Joseph Anthony, based on a story by Paul Gallico. The film was distributed by Paramount Pictures.

Synopsis
Charlie Mason and 'Rusty' Fleming are reporters for a Chicago tabloid who are romantically involved.  Charlie's mischievous shenanigans cause Rusty to move to New York. Charlie resigns his job and, along with gangster friend 'Smiles' Benson, he pursues Rusty to win her back before she marries a stuffy society author.

Cast

External links

 
Wedding Present at Allmovie

1936 films
1936 romantic comedy films
1930s screwball comedy films
American black-and-white films
American romantic comedy films
American screwball comedy films
Films about weddings
Films directed by Richard Wallace
Films produced by B. P. Schulberg
Paramount Pictures films
1930s English-language films
1930s American films